Rajendra Kumar Anayath (born; Thiruvegapura, Kerala, India) is an Indian researcher, educationist and consultant with more than two decades of experience in  result-oriented research, consulting and training in the global graphic arts industry. Anayath is currently vice chancellor of Deenbandhu Chhotu Ram University of Science and Technology located in Haryana.

References

Living people
Academic staff of Deenbandhu Chhotu Ram University of Science and Technology
People from Palakkad district
Year of birth missing (living people)